Menometrorrhagia, also known as heavy irregular menstrual bleeding, is a condition in which prolonged or excessive uterine bleeding occurs irregularly and more frequently than normal. It is thus a combination of metrorrhagia (intermenstrual bleeding) and menorrhagia (heavy/prolonged menstrual bleeding).

Causes
It can occur due to any of several causes, including hormonal imbalance, endometriosis, uterine fibroids, usage of progestin-only contraception, or cancer. Not least, it can be caused by deficiencies of several clotting factors. It can lead to anemia in long-standing cases.

Diagnosis
The initial workup includes exclusion of pregnancy and cancer, by performing a pregnancy test, a pelvic exam and a gynecologic ultrasound. Further workup depends on outcomes of the preceding tests and may include hydrosonography, hysteroscopy, endometrial biopsy, and magnetic resonance imaging.

Treatment
Treatment depends on the cause. In cases where malignancy is ruled out, hormone supplementation or the therapeutic use of hormonal contraception is usually recommended to induce bleeding on a regular schedule. Selective progesterone receptor modulators (SPRMs) are sometimes used to stop uterine bleeding.

Epidemiology
It occurs in up to 24% of women ages 40-55 years.

See also
 Von Willebrand disease
 List of hematologic conditions

References

External links 

Menstrual disorders